Hasanabad (also Romanized as Ḩasanābād) is a village in Ali Sadr Rural District, Gol Tappeh District, Kabudarahang County, Hamadan Province, Iran. At the 2006 census, its population was 152, in 31 families.

References 

Populated places in Kabudarahang County